Amblyopone australis, the southern Michelin ant, is a species of ant in the genus Amblyopone, native to Australia. The species was described by Wilhelm Ferdinand Erichson in 1842. Workers can vary in colour from yellow to dark brown or black. They have a body length of 4.5–8mm; queens are larger.

It has been accidentally introduced to New Zealand, where it has become widely established across the North Island. It is the largest ant species established in New Zealand.

Biology 
Amblyopone australis lives in relatively small colonies of tens to hundreds (up to 2000), typically under logs or stones. Adults forage above and below ground, preying upon other arthropods, paralysing them with their sting. Larvae are fed dismembered body parts of prey.

References

External links 

AntWiki: Ambylopone australis – Includes map of global distribution
Lessons from Little Creatures. Article on New Zealand ants from NZ National Geographic. Beautifully illustrated.

Amblyoponinae
Hymenoptera of Australia
Ants of New Zealand
Insects described in 1842

Hymenoptera of New Zealand